Ricky Antwan Williams (born August 29, 1978) is a former American football running back for the Indianapolis Colts of the National Football League (NFL). He played college football at Texas Tech. Williams was born in Dallas, Texas.

External links
ESPN stats

1978 births
Living people
Players of American football from Dallas
People from Duncanville, Texas
African-American players of American football
American football running backs
Indianapolis Colts players
Texas Tech Red Raiders football players
21st-century African-American sportspeople
20th-century African-American sportspeople